The Weda Bay Industrial Park is a nickel mining and industrial park complex in Central Halmahera Regency, North Maluku, Indonesia.

History

Nickel deposits were discovered in the Weda Bay area in Central Halmahera in 1996, and a joint venture between Canada-based Weda Bay Minerals and Antam (10%) was established in 1997. French mining group Eramet acquired the Canadian stake in 2006, and planned to develop the site, but due to low mineral prices the project was put on hold in 2013. In 2017, China's Tsingshan Group signed an agreement, giving it a 57% stake in Weda Bay Minerals, and giving Tsingshan the responsibility to develop mineral processing while Eramet retained its mining operations. Construction of the industrial park began in April 2018, with mining operations commencing in October 2019 and metallurgical production in April 2020.

As of 2020, four nickel ferroalloy production lines are active in the industrial park, with undergoing development of a cobalt-nickel refining complex. A nickel sulphate plant is also slated for construction in the park.

Workforce
The industrial park employed around 11,000 people as of 2020. In early 2022, the park reported that this figure has increased to 28,000 Indonesian and 1,800 foreign workers.

References

External links
 Corporate website

Industrial parks in Indonesia
Nickel mines in Indonesia
North Maluku